Malone Integrated College is a grant maintained, integrated, co-educational, multi-cultural, multi-ethnic and multi-religious secondary school, situated in Finaghy, South-West Belfast, Northern Ireland.

Background
Integrated Education is a Northern Ireland phenomenon, where traditionally schools were sectarian, either run as Catholic schools or Protestant schools. On as parental request, a school could apply to 'transition' to become Grant Maintained offering 30% of the school places to students from the minority community. Lagan College was the first integrated school to open in 1981. Malone College opened in 1998.

Site
The school is made up of multiple single-storied buildings on one campus. The site includes a new and modernised Sports Hall and Gym along with a 3G pitch which is shared with the nearby primary school, Cranmore Integrated Primary School which is lies on the same premises.

School meals hygiene 
Malone College was rated a one from the Food Standards Agency on their previous inspection, based on their rating scale of zero being the worst possible hygiene and five being the best possible hygiene, on 2 February 2018. It has been cited in their report that the school required major improvement in management of food safety and some improvements required in facility cleanliness.

The school has since been reinspected in January 2019 and has been rated a five by the FSA, indicating very good standards on hygienic food handling, cleanliness and management of food safety.

Headteachers
Marie Thompson - 2013-2017
Katrina Moore - 2017–Present

See also 
 List of integrated schools in Northern Ireland
 List of secondary schools in Northern Ireland

References

External links
 Official web site

Integrated schools in Belfast
Secondary schools in Belfast